The World Tenpin Masters (founded in 1998) is an annual Ten-pin bowling tournament. It consists of a single lane surrounded by banked seating on both sides to give the event the kind of high-pressure atmosphere that makes the Masters the world’s leading televised bowling tournament. 

The event is televised by Matchroom Sport Television and will be subsequently broadcast as 15 x 1 hour programmes both at home on Sky Sports and around the world.

History 
It is second to and starts where the Weber Cup left off. It features 16 of the world’s best bowlers, representing twelve countries, going head-to-head in a straight knockout format. Each match is played over two games with the bowler with the highest aggregate (highest total pinfall) over the two games determining the winner and proceeding. It stands next to the Weber Cup and AMF World Cup as one of the world’s largest annual international sports Ten-pin bowling championships in terms of number of participating nations. In 2009 19-year-old Matt Chamberlain of England became the youngest ever qualifier of the event after winning the PTBC 2008 Tournament.

All tournament officials are supplied by the British Tenpin Bowling Association.

2008 Tournament

The 2008 World Tenpin Masters was held at the Barnsley Metrodome from April 18 to April 20 and featured 16 of the top male and female bowlers from around the world.

Tournament Format

Prize Fund 

Winner US$30,000
Runner–Up US$10,000
Losing Semi-Finalists US$5,000
Losing Quarter Finalists US$2,000
First Round Losers US$1,500
TOTAL US$70,000

Past Tournaments

Previous Finals

External links
Bowlinglinks all over the World, sorted by categories

Tenpin bowling in the United Kingdom
Ten-pin bowling competitions
Recurring sporting events established in 1998
1998 establishments in the United Kingdom